The Bakikhanovs are an Azerbaijani noble family descended from khans of Baku.

History 

Progenitors of the line arrived in Baku after 1592. According to Abbasgulu Bakikhanov, ancestors of the family migrated to Baku from Gilan, after certain "Khan Ahmad affair", which probably means end of Malati ruler Sultan Ahmad Khan's reign. He claims ancestors of Baku khans were hailing from Nur and Kujur rulers ruling in Tabaristan, i.e. Paduspanids. First known members of the dynasty were Mammadhusein beg and his son Heybet beg. Heybet beg's elder son Dargahqulu beg was a landlord in Mashtaga who seized the city and killed sultan who was appointed by Safavids, then began to call himself khan, appointing Selim khan as naib of Absheron. He defeated forces of Surkhay khan of Qaziqumuq and later Haji Davud of Shirvan and extended his rule to Shabran and Gobustan. However he lost younger brother Huseinjan beg in battle. Dargahqulu surrendered castle to Mikhail Matyushkin with 700 soldiers in 1723 and was acknowledged by Russian Empire as local ruler.

Senior line 
Senior branch of Bakikhanovs were descendants of Dargahqulu beg, whose son Mirza Muhammad rose to the rank of independent khan in 1747. This branch provided khans, generals and military officers serving in Russian Empire:

Khans

Famous members 
 Abbasgulu Bakikhanov (1794–1847) – Colonel in Russian army, writer and scholar
 Jafargulu Bakikhanov (1793–1867) – Lieutenant general in Russian army
 Hasan Bakikhanov (8 May 1833 – 28 November 1898) – Major general in Russian army
 Ahmad Bakikhanov (16 June 1837 – 13 April 1882) – Colonel in Russian army
 Abdulla agha Bakikhanov (1824–1879) – Major general in Russian army

Junior line 
Members of junior line were descended from deceased brother of Dargahqulu – Huseinjan beg. This branch provided musicians, scientists and artists active during both Soviet and Azerbaijani periods.

Famous members 
 Ahmad Bakikhanov (1892–1973) – People's Artist of Azerbaijan (1973)
 Mammadkhan Bakikhanov (1890–1957) – Meritorous Artist of Azerbaijan (1943)
 Talat Bakikhanov (1927–2000) – Meritorous Artist of Azerbaijan (1975)
 Akif Bakikhanov (b. 1933) – Concertmaster of Azerbaijan State Symphony Orchestra
 Tofig Bakikhanov (b. 1930) – Composer and People's Artist of Azerbaijan (1991)
 Nigar Bakikhanova (1961–1996) – Arabologist, author

References

Sources 
 Abbasgulu Bakikhanov, Gulustani Iram, Baku, 1951.

Azerbaijani noble families
Azerbaijani families
Bakikhanov family